Zeto may refer to:

 Zeto (Greek), a Greek interjection
 A trade name for the drug Azithromycin
 , a 1960s Polish computer company; see 
 ZETO building; see Halina Skibniewska

See also
 N'Zeto, a town located in Zaire, Angola